Herschel “Guy” Beahm IV (born March 10, 1982), better known as Dr. Disrespect, or The Doc is an American video game streamer. He had over 4 million followers on Twitch when he was active on the site, and became known for playing battle royale games such as Apex Legends, Call of Duty: Black Ops 4, Call of Duty: Warzone, Fortnite, H1Z1, and PUBG: Battlegrounds.

In June 2020, Dr. Disrespect was banned from Twitch and his channel was removed from the site for reasons that were never explained. Sources have reported that the ban is permanent. He returned to streaming a month later on YouTube, with one stream peaking at over 510,000 simultaneous viewers. As of December 2022, he has over 4 million subscribers on YouTube.

Early life 
Herschel Beahm IV was born on March 10, 1982. He graduated in 2005 from California State Polytechnic University, Pomona, where he played NCAA Division II basketball.

Career 
Beahm's first video as the Dr Disrespect character was posted on January 11, 2010, showing gameplay of Call of Duty: Modern Warfare 2. He was featured in multiple videos for the gaming channel Machinima, mostly playing Call of Duty. He became inactive in late 2011 and did not release any content on YouTube for nearly five years.

On March 16, 2011, Dr Disrespect was appointed as the community manager of Sledgehammer Games. He joined Justin.tv (which later became Twitch) while he was working at Sledgehammer, and quit Sledgehammer in 2015 to focus on a full-time streaming career.

Dr Disrespect gained a following for playing battle royale games, starting with H1Z1 before switching to PUBG: Battlegrounds and then moving on to Call of Duty: Black Ops 4. His stream on February 5, 2018 reached a total of 388,000 concurrent viewers, just shy of beating Tyler1's record of 410,000. His popularity has led to sponsorship deals with Gillette, ASUS, Roccat and Game Fuel.

On January 10, 2019, Creative Artists Agency signed Dr Disrespect as a client. He signed a multi-year deal with Twitch in March 2020. In August 17 2020, he announced that he was writing a personal memoir called Violence. Speed. Momentum. The book was released on March 30, 2021.

In October 2020, Dr Disrespect worked with Hi-Rez Studios to design a custom map and a Dr Disrespect character skin for Rogue Company.

In December 2021, Dr Disrespect announced the launch of a triple A gaming studio named Midnight Society, which will be headed by him along with Call of Duty and Halo veterans Robert Bowling and Quinn DelHoyo, as well as Sumit Gupta acting as CEO. The studio's mission is creating a "day-zero" community experience, where the players will have the power to decide the games' "feature prioritization, pivotal design decisions, and fuel innovation in the shooter genre", and will focus on online player versus player multiplayer games. Their currently in-development free-to-play battle royale title, which is codenamed Project Moon, sparked criticism around the sale of "Founder's Access" NFTs.

Style

Streaming persona 
Dr Disrespect's on-stream persona is usually ruthless, quick-witted, and bombastic. He is often regarded as an entertainer in the streaming industry, rather than a professional gamer. ESPN describes him as "a WWE character in the competitive gaming world" and he himself has said, "I created a character who plays multiplayer video games, and he's considered the most dominating gaming specimen."

When playing the Dr Disrespect character, he wears a black mullet wig, sunglasses, a red or black long-sleeved athletic shirt, and a red or black tactical vest. He sports a mustache he has nicknamed "Slick Daddy" and "The Poisonous Ethiopian Caterpillar".

Discontent for controller "aim assist" 
He has repeatedly made known his discontent with "aim assist" mechanics in first-person shooters (a feature intended to make aiming easier) that only apply to players using a controller but are active during cross-play against mouse-and-keyboard players like himself. He argues that controller-wielding players who enable it have an unfair advantage over mouse-and-keyboard players, making claims that it reduces the skill involved such that it's "so easy you can close your eyes" and even going as far to compare the mechanic to cheating by calling it "like a version of hacks". Fellow streamer TimTheTatman has publicly suggested in response "if controller is so broken then play controller" as there is nothing technically "illegal" about the mechanic as it is a developer-implemented feature.

Controversies

E3 bathroom filming incident 
On June 11, 2019, Dr Disrespect's Twitch channel was suspended as he was livestreaming while attending the 2019 edition of the Electronic Entertainment Expo (E3) in Los Angeles, California. Dr Disrespect and his cameraman went into a public restroom (Dr Disrespect re-entered the bathroom on two occasions, with filming still going on) at the venue in violation of Twitch's privacy rules and privacy laws in the California Penal Code. In addition, E3 organizer Entertainment Software Association revoked Dr Disrespect's E3 pass, banning him from the event. Twitch reinstated the DrDisrespect channel on June 25.

Permanent ban from Twitch 
On June 26, 2020, the DrDisRespect Twitch account was banned from Twitch. Twitch's official statement on the ban said "As is our process, we take appropriate action when we have evidence that a streamer has acted in violation of our Community Guidelines or Terms of Service. These apply to all streamers regardless of status or prominence in the community". No specific details have been released. On June 27, Dr Disrespect tweeted that he had not yet been informed on the exact reason for the ban. On July 16, 20 days after he was banned, he broke his silence and was interviewed by PC Gamer and The Washington Post; insisting that he still does not know why Twitch banned him from the platform, that his contracts were still in good standing, debunks any "crazy speculation" or theory that developed and is focusing on his upcoming "Doc 3.0" personality.

On August 6, after 42 days without streaming, he tweeted a link to his YouTube channel with the caption "Tomorrow, we arrive". He went live on YouTube at the same time, but the stream only showed a looping video of a custom Champions Club gas station. He also confirmed that he would show up on stream at noon PDT on the following day. On August 7, Dr Disrespect returned to his stream at 1 pm PDT. The reason for his ban has yet to be announced.

On August 23, 2021, Dr Disrespect revealed that he has known "for months" the reason for his ban and his intentions to litigate due to suggested major damages.

On March 10, 2022, Dr Disrespect and Twitch each announced that they had resolved their legal dispute with neither party admitting to any wrongdoing. In a follow-up tweet, he clarified that he will not be returning to the Twitch platform.

Personal life
Beahm is married and has a daughter. In December 2017, he took a two-month hiatus from streaming to focus on his marriage after he admitted to being unfaithful to his wife.

Beahm stated that an unknown person shot at his house with a BB gun and hit an upstairs window on September 11, 2018. This was reportedly the second time that someone shot at his house.

Filmography

Video games

Awards and nominations

References

External links 

 

Living people
Place of birth missing (living people)
American esports players
American YouTubers
Cal Poly Pomona Broncos men's basketball players
Gaming YouTubers
People from San Diego County, California
1982 births
The Game Awards winners
YouTube streamers